Igelsbett is a hill of Hesse, Germany.

Hills of Hesse